Jaszczułty  is a village in the administrative district of Gmina Długosiodło, within Wyszków County, Masovian Voivodeship, in east-central Poland.

The village is located 100 meters above sea level, and has a population of 520.

References

Villages in Wyszków County